The ARIA Music Award for Best New Talent was an award presented at the annual ARIA Music Awards. It was presented from 1987 through to 1998.

The award for Best New Talent was first presented in 1987. Crowded House won the award with their single "Don't Dream It's Over". It was retired after the 1998 awards with Natalie Imbruglia winning the final award for her album Left of the Middle.

Winners and nominees
In the following table, the winner is highlighted in a separate colour, and in boldface; the nominees are those that are not highlighted or in boldface.

References

External links

New